A vortex filter is a filter used in rainwater harvesting systems to separate medium to large sized debris from the flow of water before the water flows into a tank, cistern or  reservoir. by directing the flow around the inside of the wall of the filter housing. Any material with a density greater than water is pushed to the outside and allows cleaner water to flow through a central fine mesh basket into the supply pipe.

All debris washes out of a large diameter drain pipe in the base of the filter body.

These filters have a relatively low overall efficiency because of the need to have a significant waste water flow to remove the separated solids. They also work with greater efficiency during repetitively high flows which generate higher input water velocities. They are best suited to high rainfall areas with high intensity precipitation over short periods rather than low intensity rainfall over long periods.

They require less maintenance than some other pre-filters as there is no filter medium to clean.

References

Water filters